Drumrainy is a townland of 231 acres in County Donegal, Ireland, 4 km from the village of Dunkineely. It is situated in the civil parish of Inver and the historic barony of Banagh.

See also
List of townlands in County Donegal

References

Civil parish of Inver
Townlands of County Donegal